François Pierre Rodier (born 1854) was Governor General for various colonies in the Second French Colonial Empire under Third Republic.  He was born in Vieille-Brioude of Haute Loire département, France.

Titles held

References

French colonial governors and administrators
Governors of French India
People of the French Third Republic
Governors-General of French Indochina
Year of death missing
Burials at Père Lachaise Cemetery
Governors of Cochinchina
1854 births